Clematis recta, the erect clematis or ground virginsbower, is a species of Clematis unusual in that it is a free-standing shrub rather than a climbing plant.  Growing usually on the margins of woodland areas, it is native to Eastern, Southern and Central Europe.

External links 
 Plants for a Future database

recta
Flora of Europe
Plants described in 1753
Taxa named by Carl Linnaeus